Shixia Township is a township under the administration of Zuoquan County, Shanxi, China. , it has 28 villages under its administration.

References 

Township-level divisions of Shanxi
Zuoquan County